Songs for Dustmites is the debut album by American musician, actor and former Blue's Clues host Steve Burns. It was released on August 12, 2003, by PIAS America. The album was produced by Dave Fridmann, member of alternative rock band Mercury Rev and the producer of most of the albums by The Flaming Lips; and Ed Buller.

After quitting Blue's Clues, Burns, "in a position where [he] could do what [he] wanted", decided to collaborate with Fridmann and other members of The Flaming Lips. After receiving multiple offers from various record labels, Burns chose PIAS America. Songs for Dustmites is a pop/rock or indie rock album, and its lyrics are mostly about "science and love". It received positive reviews from music critics, although some of them believed that the album was only good because of his collaborations.

The song "Mighty Little Man" is used as the theme song to the CBS television show Young Sheldon.

Background and recording
Before acting in Blue's Clues, Burns had been in many high-school and college bands. When he left the show in 2002 after working there for half a dozen years, he "found [himself] in a position where [he] could do what [he] wanted", he decided to become a musician. He worked on demos, rehearsing the songs over and over again, scared to show them to anyone. Burns began recording the album once he got a computer that could record and edit sounds. He recorded it in a trial-and-error way, until he believed it sounded right. Burns started making Songs for Dustmites after he "was obsessed with a picture someone had shown [him] of a dustmite fighting with a micro gear".

Burns later sent producer Dave Fridmann an e-mail introducing himself and sent the demos the day after Fridmann's son had a Blue's Clues-themed birthday party. Fridmann liked the demos, so he sent Burns to Tarbox Road Studios in Fredonia, New York, where they worked with The Flaming Lips member Steven Drozd. Mac Randall of The New York Observer hypothesized that the band decided to work with Burns because it was "too off-the-wall to resist." Burns stated of recording with members of the Flaming Lips that "There were definitely moments when I would run into the next room so I could giggle maniacally, jump up and down and clap my hands", calling the experience "a dream come true". According to Burns, "he and Fridmann gave [him] a lot of help in understanding the studio process, how it all works, how to take a musical idea and shine it up into a song". Ed Buller wrote to Burns, "sort of in disbelief". Burns suspects that Buller searched the Internet for Burns and downloaded his songs, "expecting to make fun of [him]", and was surprised that the music was not bad. Burns also met and worked with Mike Rubin from Murmur Music, saying that "some of the best work on the album came out of that relationship". Burns received numerous offers from various record labels mostly due to him making an album being a "ridiculous story". He chose to sign with PIAS Records after talking with Kevin Wortis of the label, saying he "was the first one who sat me down and said, 'This makes sense. I don't know why, but there is a thread of logic between Blue's Clues, the Flaming Lips and your record'."

Composition

Lyrically, Songs for Dustmites deals with "familiar themes of love and loss", while Burns himself has described the album as "songs about science and love". Musically, the album fits into the pop/rock and alternative rock genres, and is heavily influenced by the Flaming Lips. The lyrics of the opening track "Mighty Little Man" have been interpreted in different ways: a television watcher who suddenly turns into "an everyday superhero", or "a lonely inventor's eureka moment". It was inspired by inventor Thomas Edison and his "DIY projects that changed human history". When Burns made the song, he wanted to "write a positive, empowering, exclamation point of a song". The song itself contains a "fury of noise". The following track, "What I Do on Saturday", is a "playful" pop song, while "Maintain" is a more mainstream song influenced by American alternative band They Might Be Giants. The song "Troposphere" is "bright and bouncy", sounding like the Flaming Lips song "Fight Test". The ballad "A Song for Dustmites" contains piano and synths. The next track, "Stick Around", is melancholic and sounds optimistic with its cello and trumpet. ">1" is a "simple" downtempo song that tells the story of a dysfunctional relationship. It features strings and a guitar solo.

Reception

Songs for Dustmites received positive reviews from music critics; most of them were surprised that an album made by the former Blue's Clues host would be any good. Heather Phares of AllMusic called the album "a promising debut", writing it was "a good-natured collection of atmospheric pop that takes a few chances now and then." She gave the album three and a half stars out of five. Pitchfork gave it a 7.8/10 and complimented Burns' "lyrical insight and gift for writing and arranging endlessly listenable pop songs". The album as a whole was described as managing "to remain true to Burns' legacy as a nice-guy kid's show host despite having made an unabashedly adult record that deals with familiar themes of love and loss". Brian Houston of PopMatters wrote that "Songs for Dustmites is a successful album, but the caveat will always be that the reason for the success lies with the Lips contributions and not with Burns' talent or vision".

Track listing

Personnel
Credits are adapted from the album's liner notes.
Steve Burns – lead vocals, guitar (1–7, 9–12); harmonica (1, 3, 4),  thinking chair (4); effects (5, 6, 11), tone generator (7), Rhodes piano (8), space oscillator (8, 9, 11)
Steven Drozd – keyboards, drums (1–3, 5, 9); guitar (1, 5, 12), backing vocals (2, 3, 9), bass (5), piano (9, 12), Hammond organ (12)
Dave Fridmann – bass (1)
Ed Buller – keyboards (2, 3)
Mary Gavazzi Fridmann – magic porpoise voice (5, 9)
Michael Rubin – baritone guitar (6, 11, 12), keyboards (6, 10–12), trumpet and string arrangements (6)
Jim O'Connor – trumpet, piccolo trumpet (6)
Dorothy Lawson – cello (6)
Ralph Farris – viola (6)
Conrad Korsch – bass (10)
Bernard Devlin – drums (10–12)
Jim Whitney – bass (11, 12)
Michael Gentile – flute (12)
Peter Robbins – tambourine (12)

References

2003 debut albums
Albums produced by Ed Buller
Steve Burns albums
Albums produced by Dave Fridmann
Albums recorded at Tarbox Road Studios